SM U-24 was one of 329 submarines serving in the Imperial German Navy in World War I. She was engaged in commerce warfare during the First Battle of the Atlantic.

In seven patrols, U-24 sank a total of 33 merchant ships and 1 auxiliary warship totalling  and one warship for 15,000 tons, damaged three merchant ships for 14,318 GRT, and took one merchant ship as prize of 1,925 GRT.

Her second kill was the most significant. She was hit in the number one boiler room on the port side. Out of a crew of approximately 711 men, 547 died as a result. This was one of the largest ships sunk by U-boats during the war.

In 1915, U-24 claimed another noted victim, the passenger steamer , causing 44 deaths, including three Americans. Arabic sank in 10 minutes. This escalated the U-boat fear in the U.S. and caused a diplomatic incident which resulted in the suspension of torpedoing non-military ships without notice.

Summary of raiding history

References

Notes

Citations

Further reading

World War I submarines of Germany
1913 ships
Ships built in Kiel
U-boats commissioned in 1913
Type U 23 submarines